Šembije is a village north of Ilirska Bistrica in the Inner Carniola region of Slovenia.

Mass graves
Šembije is the site of two known mass graves from the period immediately after the Second World War. They are both located south of the village and contain the remains of German soldiers from the 97th Corps that fell at the beginning of May 1945. The Golak Mass Grave lies next to the road and contains the remains of 12 soldiers. The Vineyard Mass Grave lies east of the road and contains the remains of 30 soldiers.

Church
The local church in the settlement is dedicated to Saint Vitus and belongs to the Parish of Knežak.

References

External links

Šembije on Geopedia

Populated places in the Municipality of Ilirska Bistrica